is a retired Nippon Professional Baseball player who played for the Lotte Orions and the Chunichi Dragons.

External links

Living people
1962 births
Baseball people from Kanagawa Prefecture
Japanese baseball players
Nippon Professional Baseball infielders
Lotte Orions players
Chiba Lotte Marines players
Chunichi Dragons players